The Edge of Sadness is a novel by the American author Edwin O'Connor. It was published in 1961 and won the Pulitzer Prize for Fiction in 1962. The story is about a middle-aged Catholic priest in New England.

Story 
This drama revolves around Father Hugh Kennedy, a recovering alcoholic. In the beginning of the story Kennedy has returned to his home town (an unnamed New England seaport city that is the seat of a bishop, rather than an archbishop; it thus most closely corresponds with O'Connor's own birthplace of Providence, RI) to try to mend his professional career as a priest. He becomes involved again with the Carmodys, a wealthy family whose ancestry, like his own, is Irish and whom he has known since childhood. The story that unfolds is a tale of long hidden emotion and longing. It deals with friendship and loneliness, spirituality, and newfound hope.

External links
 Photos of the first edition of The Edge of Sadness

References 

1961 American novels
Pulitzer Prize for Fiction-winning works
Novels by Edwin O'Connor
Little, Brown and Company books
Catholic novels